This is a partial list of text and image duplicating processes used in business and government from the Industrial Revolution forward.  Some are mechanical and some are chemical.  There is naturally some overlap with printing processes and photographic processes, but the challenge of precisely duplicating business letters, forms, contracts, and other paperwork prompted some unique solutions as well.  There were many short-lived inventions along the way.

Duplicating processes
Within each type, the methods are arranged in very rough chronological order.

 Methods of copying handwritten letters
 Manifold stylographic writer, using early "carbonic paper"
 Letter copying book process
Mechanical processes
Tracing to make accurate hand-drawn copies
Pantograph, manual device for making drawn copies without tracing, can also enlarge or reduce
Printmaking, which includes engraving and etching
Relief printing including woodcut
Intaglio (printmaking) or copperplate engraving
Planographic printing
Line engraving

 Printing/Applied ink methods
 Letterpress printing (via printing press)
 Gelatin methods (also indirect method)
 Hectograph
 Collography, autocopyist
 Chromograph, Copygraph, Polygraph
 Flexography
 Spirit duplicator (also Rexograph, Ditto machine, Banda machine, or Roneo)
 Lithographic processes
 Transfer lithography
 Anastatic lithography
 Autographic process
 Offset lithography
 Photolithography
 Stencil-based copying methods
 Papyrography
 Electric pen, invented by Thomas Edison
 Trypograph (also file plate process)
 Cyclostyle, Neostyle
 Stencil-based machines
 Mimeograph (also Roneo, Gestetner)
 Digital Duplicators (also called CopyPrinters, e.g., Riso and Gestetner)
 Typewriter-based copying methods
 Carbon paper
 Blueprint typewriter ribbon
 Carbonless copy paper
 Photographic processes:
 Reflex copying process (also reflectography, reflexion copying)
 Breyertype, Playertype, Manul Process, Typon Process, Dexigraph, Linagraph
 Daguerreotype
 Salt print
 Calotype (the first photo process to use a negative, from which multiple prints could be made)
 Cyanotype
 Photostat machine
 Rectigraph
 Airgraph (also V-mail)
 Kodagraph autopositive paper
 Kodagraph repro-negative paper
 Diffusion transfer
 Verifax, Copyproof
 Photomechanical transfer (also PMT''')
 Duostat, duoprint
 Retroflex (printing process)
 Dual spectrum process
 LightJet
 Ozalid
 Chemical processes
 Aniline process
 Cyanotype (used for blueprints)
 Diazotype (also whiteprint, ammonia print, or gas print)
 Heat-sensitivity methods
 Thermofax (also thermography'')
 Eichner drycopy process
 Adherography
 Electrostatic methods
 Electrofax
 Xerography, Photocopying
 Ultraviolet-sensitivity methods
 APT process, for transferring drawings to animation cels
 Image scanning and digital printing

External links 
 
 Making Copies from Carbon to Kinkos
 Copies in Seconds (PDF)
 Antique Copying Machines at Officemuseum.com
 Office and Reprographic Printing Cheatsheet – Preservation Self-Assessment Program

Office equipment
Printing
Technology-related lists